Rosario, officially the Municipality of Rosario,  is a 2nd class municipality in the province of Agusan del Sur, Philippines. According to the 2020 census, it has a population of 49,610 people.

Rosario was historically part of San Francisco until June 21, 1969, when it became a separate municipality through Republic Act No. 5760. The town was named after its patron saint Nuestra Senora del Rosario.

Geography

According to the Philippine Statistics Authority, the municipality has a land area of  constituting  of the  total area of Agusan del Sur.

Climate

Barangays
Rosario is politically subdivided into 11 barangays.

Demographics

In the 2020 census, Rosario had a population of 49,610.

Economy

References

External links

 [ Philippine Standard Geographic Code]

Municipalities of Agusan del Sur